Wanakah is a hamlet  (and census-designated place) in the town of Hamburg in Erie County, New York, United States. As of the 2010 census, it had a population of 3,199.

Wanakah is part of the Buffalo–Niagara Falls Metropolitan Statistical Area.

Geography
Wanakah is located at  (42.74622, -78.90308) in the western part of the town of Hamburg, on the shore of Lake Erie. The Wanakah CDP encompasses the hamlets of Wanakah, Mount Vernon and Clifton Heights. New York State Route 5 (Lake Shore Road) is the main road through the CDP, leading northeast to Lackawanna and Buffalo and southwest towards Angola.

Demographics

References

Hamlets in New York (state)
Census-designated places in Erie County, New York
Census-designated places in New York (state)
Buffalo–Niagara Falls metropolitan area
Hamlets in Erie County, New York